The Men's 77 kilograms event at the 2018 Asian Games took place on 23 August 2018 at the Jakarta International Expo Hall A.

Schedule
All times are Western Indonesia Time (UTC+07:00)

Records 

 Nijat Rahimov's world and Asian records were rescinded in 2022.

Results
Legend
NM — No mark

References

Results

External links
Weightlifting at the 2018 Asian Games

Men's 77 kg